Bill Lawrence (born Willi Lorenz Stich; March 24, 1931 – November 2, 2013) was a pickup and guitar designer He was born in Wahn, Cologne, Germany and began his musical career in the 1950s as a jazz guitarist, performing under the name Billy Lorento. He died in Southern California, United States.

As a musician, Lawrence created pickups that he felt best suited his needs and performance style, and went on to work with Framus and became an endorser, including such models as the "Billy Lorento" 5/120. He was also an endorser for Fender in Europe.

Moving to the United States, Lawrence designed pickups and assisted in electric guitar design for Fender, Gibson, Peavey and other companies. While at Gibson from 1968-1972, Lawrence helped design the "super-humbucker" pickup and the L6-S. He helped redesign the electronics of the SG and contributed significantly to the S-1 and Marauder, as well as to some bass models, like the Ripper, Grabber and G3.

References

External links

Guitar pickup manufacturers
2013 deaths
1931 births